American Grand Prix may refer to two automobile races.

 United States Grand Prix, originally known as the American Grand Prize, a current Formula One race
 Grand Prix of America, a failed Formula One race proposal

See also
 Motorcycle Grand Prix of the Americas
 United States Grand Prix (disambiguation)
 Grand Prix Americas (disambiguation)